The Sailing World Championships (formerly ISAF Sailing World Championships) are World championships in sailing for the 10 events contested at the Summer Olympics, organized by World Sailing (formerly ISAF) and held every four years since 2003. In contrast to other years, when each class organise their World championship under supervision of World Sailing, they are the combined World championships for all the disciplines of the next Summer Olympics and serves as the major qualification event for it.

History
In 1998 the ISAF WOrld Sailing Championships were held in Dubai. 
The ISAF Sailing World Championships was held in Cádiz in 2003, followed by Cascais in 2007 and Perth in 2011.

In 2014, Santander hosted the 4th ISAF Sailing World Championships attracting more than 1,100 competitors, which distributed half of qualifications for the 2016 Summer Olympics sailing event.

Editions

Equipment

Legend: M – Men; W – Women; Mx – Mixed; O – Open;

All-time medal table

See also
Olympic sailing classes
Sailing at the Summer Olympics
World championships in sailing
Windsurfing World Championships

References

External links
Sailing competitions

 
World Sailing
World championships in sailing